Doudleby is a municipality and village in České Budějovice District in the South Bohemian Region of the Czech Republic. It has about 500 inhabitants.

Administrative parts

The village of Straňany is an administrative part of Doudleby.

Etymology
The name is derived from the Slavic tribe of Dulebes, who lived there as in the mid-10th century. Al-Masudi mentioned them as Dūlāba and their "king" (ruler) as Wānjslāf (most probably Wenceslaus I, Duke of Bohemia).

Geography
The municipality lies in the Gratzen Foothills. The village of Doudleby lies in a meander of the Malše River, and the village od Straňany lies on the opposite bank.

History

The first written mention of Doudleby is in the Chronica Boemorum chronicle, where there is a mention of a gord related to the year 981. According to the chronicle, this fortified settlement was part of the early medieval Slavník's territory, but according to today's historians, it was a Přemyslid gord. Doudleby was then located on at the crossroads of two important trade routes and served as the centre of the region. After the founding of the city of České Budějovice in 1265, the importance of Doudleby quickly declined.

Sights
The Church of Saint Vincent of Saragossa was first mentioned in 1143. The oldest preserved parts are the Gothic sacristy and chancel from the 14th century. The nave was added at the end of the 15th century. In 1708–1709, the church was rebuilt in the Baroque style, and the tower was added.

References

External links

Villages in České Budějovice District